"Pound the Alarm" is a song by Trinidadian-American rapper Nicki Minaj, serving as the fourth single from her second studio album, Pink Friday: Roman Reloaded (2012). The song was written by RedOne, Carl Falk, Rami Yacoub, Bilal Hajji, and Achraf Jannusi, with co-writing credits from Minaj, and production was handled by RedOne, Falk, and Yacoub. Despite the song not winning the poll where Minaj and her label asked fans to pick the next single from her album, the label went ahead and released "Pound the Alarm" due to a large number of airplay requests for the song.

Musically, "Pound the Alarm" is a Eurodance song that talks about having a good time and partying all night, as well as going to festivals/carnivals as the music video portrays. The song reached the top ten in Australia, Canada, Finland, Ireland, Israel, New Zealand, and the United Kingdom and in top twenty in Mexico and France. In the United States, the song peaked at number 15 on the Billboard Hot 100, and number one on the US Hot Dance Club Songs chart.

The accompanying music video was shot in her native birth country, Trinidad and Tobago, and features Minaj performing at a national Trinidad and Tobago Carnival as well as dancing from locals of the country. The music video received positive reviews, with many enjoying the fun atmosphere. The song was featured on Minaj's Pink Friday: Reloaded Tour. The song is included in the game Just Dance 2014. It is also one of the select songs available on the demo version.

Background
On May 24, 2012, a poll was posted on Minaj's official website asking the fans to choose the next single(s). The poll is divided into three categories. The third and final category asks to choose between "Pound the Alarm", "Whip It", and "Va Va Voom". "Va Va Voom" had the most votes and won the poll. "Whip It" came in second and "Pound the Alarm" came in third. After the poll results were finalized, a fan then told Minaj; "ΝΟΟΟ!! Pound The Alarm is way more energetic!!!", where Minaj replied: "I agree!!!! Fun2perform. But the polls don't lie do they?"." The song was eventually trending on Twitter for the choice of the songs. Moments later she tweeted: "Oop. Just got word that radio 1 in the uk and nova & 2day fm in australia are runnin w/ #poundthealarm due to the amount of requests" and later added after "Sorry va va voomers...Looks like France has chosen #poundthealarm for the win as well barbz."

Minaj confirmed on Twitter on June 6, 2012, that she chose "Pound the Alarm" as the next single instead of "Va Va Voom" owing to the number of radio requests "Pound the Alarm" was getting in the UK, Australia, and France. It officially impacted Australian radio on June 12, 2012, where it was the most added track of the week. It also impacted UK radio on June 15, 2012. In the United States, the song was released as the second mainstream single and fourth single overall from the album on July 17, 2012.

Composition
"Pound the Alarm" is a Eurodance song produced by RedOne, Falk, and Rami. It is composed in common time in the key of C minor with a tempo of 125 beats per minute. It moves in common time and follows a chord progression of Cm–Gm–A–B, and Nicki's vocals span from B3 to A4. The song makes use of EDM, techno and house in its composition, while also being influenced by rave. After each chorus there is a "frantic" Eurodance and dubstep breakdown, and also features the sounds of alarms, which were sampled from American artist Britney Spears from her 2000 single "Stronger", weaving beats, and "seize-the-night" lyrics.

Lyrically, it talks about having a good time and partying. However, in one of the verses, she warns her lover by saying, "I'm a bad bitch, no muzzle", meaning that whilst muzzles prevent dogs from barking, nobody can stop her from saying what she wants to say, as she is a 'bad bitch'. When the song received mixed reception from critics with it being too similar, RedOne, who produced both the song and "Starships" told MTV News that "Pound the Alarm" is sonically edgier. "It's got the pop element, but it's got some hard-core elements, some dance underground elements." Laurence Green from MusicOMH compared the song to 2 Unlimited by saying "The techno push of 'Pound the Alarm' comes on like [2 Unlimited] set loose in the studio [...]". Kitty Empire from The Observer described the song as firmly a "half-rap, half-pop" song.

Critical reception
Entertainment Weekly gave a positive review by describing the song as "The perfect trunk rattler to blast from your pink Barbie Bentley, with booming synths that build to a brain-numbing epiphany: 'Music. Makes Me. High.'" Slant Magazine stated that "Pound the Alarm", along with "Starships", "Whip It", and "Automatic", are "retro-techno-pop earsores  indiscriminately arranged bits of LMFAO's 'Sexy and I Know It', Rihanna's 'We Found Love', and pretty much any recent Britney Spears or Katy Perry song you can name", adding that "Her repeated exhortation on 'Pound the Alarm' to get things 'hotter and hotter and sexy and hotter' is about as weak as club-jam come-ons get." Fact gave it a positive review, saying "its avalanche-force hoover noises are so over-the-top and its hooks so catchy that you may as well save time and cave into it now."

Kitty Empire from The Observer said the song makes the album "a persuasive compromise between this album's chart fodder and its rap turf." Andrew Unterberger of Popdust gave the song a mixed review, and compared it to the works of Jennifer Lopez, Taio Cruz, The Black Eyed Peas, and Beyoncé. Billboard editor Andrew Hampp gave the song a negative review, stating that it is a "'Starships' sound-alike" and saying the only difference is that "Nicki does a little bit more singing than she does on her current single, but otherwise the two tracks are virtually indistinguishable. Even the chorus is a rewrite." Emily Mackay from NME said the song was a "charmless trancey ba[n]ger" and categorised it as a part of the album that "flipflops". Matthew Cole was more negative, stating the song is "about as weak as club-jam come-ons get". Drowned in Sound called the song "trashy electro [music]".

Commercial performance
"Pound the Alarm" debuted at 92 and peaked at number 15 on the US Billboard Hot 100 and peaked at number fourteen on the US Pop Songs. The song also peaked at number one on Hot Dance Club Songs. The song managed to peak inside the top ten in Canada, peaking at number nine on the charts.

The song also managed to have success in the Oceanic regions. In Australia, the song debuted at number thirty-three, until the next week it peaked at number ten for two non-consecutive weeks. It was eventually certified 2× Platinum by Australian Recording Industry Association (ARIA) for sales of 70,000. In New Zealand, the song debuted at twelve, until the next week it peaked at number six for two consecutive weeks. The song was then certified Gold by Recording Industry Association of New Zealand for sales of 7,500.

The song was also very successful in European regions. In the United Kingdom, the song debuted at seventy-nine until it fell out; it later re-entered at number sixty-one and peaked at number eight. The song also marks Minaj's third solo top ten entry in the UK, following "Super Bass" and "Starships". In France, the song debuted at 137, until it rose to number 52. “Pound the Alarm” later re-entered at 59, peaking at nineteen. In Finland, the song debuted at fourteen and peaked at number four. In Belgium (Flanders and Wallonia), the song debuted at 41 and 43, reaching numbers fourteen and thirty-one, respectively (for two consecutive weeks). The song debuted at 86 on the Dutch Top 40 and peaked at number 30 on the chart; it further debuted and peaked at number 23 in Denmark. In Switzerland, the song debuted at number 52 and peaked at number 44. It peaked at number eight in Scotland as well.

Music video
The video was shot in Trinidad at Queen's Park Savannah on July 4, 2012, and had what was seen to be a carnival theme. Open auditions were held for the video on-set. 500 people were scheduled to appear in the music video and were asked to come wearing carnival attire. Director Benny Boom, who filmed Minaj's "Beez in the Trap" and "Right by My Side" videos, also directed the "Pound the Alarm" video. Minaj released a 'behind the scenes' video of the shoot on July 13, 2012. It premiered on Minaj's VEVO account on Tuesday, July 31, 2012.

Synopsis

The video for "Pound the Alarm" begins with Minaj on a building, singing and looking over the city. She pays tribute to Trinidad and Tobago, her birthplace, and the Trinidad and Tobago Carnival. The video opens with a steelpan version of the song, and shots of different locations in Port of Spain. Then the flag of Trinidad and Tobago appears before Minaj is shown standing in a bird eye view of Port of Spain. Minaj is wearing a custom-made Trinidadian flag-themed bra and high-rise panties. She then is seen walking down an alleyway in a red carnival costume, joined by other women in the same Trinbagonian carnival attire, they are seen partying and dancing to the song. In this scene, Minaj has a large feathered headdress on. Minaj is then seen onstage holding a concert with Trinidadian artistes: Machel Montano, Bunji Garlin and Fay-Ann Lyons, while confetti comes down and the audience throw up the Trinidadian flag. Many Trinidadian carnival characters appear in the video such as Dame Lorraine, Blue Devil, Jab Jab, Moko Jumbies (people walking on stilts), and others. Towards the end of the video, Minaj is sitting on top of a stereo speaker, while fireworks appear in the night sky. Minaj forms a conga line and does some choreography with her backup dancers. Minaj and other women are dancing sensually on each other; the local term for this dance is called "wining". Towards the end of the video Minaj is seen in front of her cousins from Trinidad, and wrapping a Trinidadian bandanna around her mouth. The video ends with Minaj walking towards a bright light still dressed in Carnival attire.

Of the video, Romeo's Corner said "Other than being a very colorful video and the beautiful Trinidad as its backdrop, I don't see how this video could do anything with 'Pound the Alarm' other than having fun."

Live performances and other usages
Minaj performed "Pound the Alarm" live during Radio 1's Hackney Weekend on June 23, 2012, as part of the line-up on the main stage. Minaj performed the song on The Tonight Show with Jay Leno on July 13, 2012. The song was also included on Minaj's Pink Friday Tour and her Pink Friday: Reloaded Tour. She also performed the song on Today, along with "Starships" and "I Am Your Leader".

The song is featured in the fourth episode of the tenth season of RuPaul's Drag Race. At the end of the episode, the bottom two contestants, Dusty Ray Bottoms and Monét X Change, had to lip sync to the song to avoid elimination, with Bottoms being the loser.

Track listing
 Digital download
 "Pound the Alarm" – 3:21
 "Pound the Alarm" (music video) – 4:05

 Digital download EP
 "Pound the Alarm" (Liam Keegan Mix) – 4:42
 "Pound the Alarm" (Nicole Chen Mix) – 5:43
 "Pound the Alarm" (Nick Lees Mix) – 5:51
 "Pound the Alarm" (Jelfa Mix) – 5:27
 "Pound the Alarm" (Kitz Looper Mix) – 5:25

 US CD single  
 "Pound the Alarm" (Liam Keegan Mix) – 4:42
 "Pound the Alarm" (Nicole Chen Mix) – 5:43
 "Pound the Alarm" (Nick Lees Mix) – 5:51
 "Pound the Alarm" (Jelfa Mix) – 5:27
 "Pound the Alarm" (Kitz Looper Mix) – 5:25

Credits and personnel
Recording
Recorded at Conway Recording Studios, Hollywood, California, United States
Mixed at Conway Recording Studios

Personnel
Nicki Minaj – songwriter, vocals 
RedOne – songwriter, producer, backing vocals, instruments
Carl Falk – songwriter, producer, mixing, instruments
Rami Yacoub – songwriter, producer, mixing, instruments
Bilal Hajji – songwriter, backing vocals
Achraf Jannusi – songwriter, backing vocals
Trevor Muzzy – recording, mixing, vocal editing
Ariel Chobaz – recording
Jon Sher – recording assistant
Jeanette Olsson – backing vocals

Charts and certifications

Weekly charts

Year-end charts

Certifications

Release history

See also
 List of number-one dance singles of 2012 (U.S.)

References

Nicki Minaj songs
2012 singles
Eurodance songs
Songs written by Nicki Minaj
Song recordings produced by RedOne
Songs written by RedOne
Songs written by Carl Falk
Songs written by Rami Yacoub
Songs written by Bilal Hajji
Song recordings produced by Rami Yacoub
Music videos directed by Benny Boom
Songs written by AJ Junior
2011 songs
Songs about parties